Alfred-Georges Regner (22 February 1902, in Amiens – 20 September 1987, in Bayeux), was a French surrealist painter and engraver.

Books of Regner's work
 Georges Turpin. A-G. Regner. Les palettes nouvelles. Paris: R. Debresse, 1951. 
 A. G. Regner: Œuvre gravé. Calais: Musée des beaux-arts et de la dentelle, 1991. 
 Valérie Viscardi and Alfred-Georges Regner. Alfred-Georges Regner: Peintre-graveur, 1902–1987: Catalogue raisonné. Paris: Éditions d'art Somogy, 2002. .

External links
 "Alfred-Georges Regner, peintre-graveur, Amiens, 1902 – Bayeux, 1987" 
 Louis Le Roc'h Morgère, et al. Alfred-Georges Regner: Amiens, 1902 – Bayeux, 1987: Peintre-graveur. Éditions des Archives du Calvados, 2007. . 

1902 births
1987 deaths
People from Amiens
20th-century engravers
20th-century French painters
20th-century French male artists
French male painters
French engravers
French surrealist artists
École nationale supérieure des arts décoratifs alumni
20th-century French printmakers